Thayanur  is a village in the Srirangam taluk of Tiruchirappalli district in Tamil Nadu, India.

Demographics 

As per the 2001 census, Thayanur had a population of 8,402 with 4,140 males and 4,262 females. The sex ratio was 1029 and the literacy rate, 65.72.

References 

 

Villages in Tiruchirappalli district